An atoll is a type of island.

Atoll or ATOLL may also refer to:

Atolls of the Maldives, in the Indian Ocean
Atolls Rural LLG in off the coast of Bougainville, Papua New Guinea
Atoll (band), a French progressive rock band
atoll (programming), a function in C programming language
ATOLL programming language, used for automating the checking and launch of Saturn rockets
Antarctic Technology Offshore Lagoon Laboratory, a floating oceanographic laboratory
Vympel K-13 (NATO reporting name), a Soviet and Russian air-to-air missile

See also

Atholl (disambiguation)
Athol (disambiguation)
Atol (disambiguation)
Atole, a Mexican hot beverage